RATCH-Australia Corporation (RAC) is an Australian electricity generation company. It is a subsidiary of RATCH Group (formerly known as Ratchaburi Electricity Generating Holding Company), a public company listed on the Stock Exchange of Thailand. RATCH-Australia owns both renewable energy and fossil fuel power stations in Australia.

History
In 2007, Transfield Services spun-off its infrastructure assets into the Transfield Services Infrastructure Fund. In November 2007, it acquired five further power generation assets from Stanwell Corporation and Tarong Energy.

RATCH-Australia was established in July 2011 when its parent company bought an 80% stake in Transfield Services Infrastructure Fund via a scheme of arrangement.

Power stations owned by RATCH-Australia are:

References

Electric power companies of Australia
2011 establishments in Australia